Kojagori; was a Bengali television soap opera that premiered on 2 February 2015, and aired on Zee Bangla. Produced by Magic Moments Motion Pictures, it starred Raja Goswami Om and Aparajita Ghosh Das in lead roles.

The show revolves around Shouronil Mitta (Raja Goswami Om) and Phuljhuri (Aparajita Ghosh Das) who are diametrically different from each other.

Plot summary 
While Phuljhuri (Aparajita Ghosh Das) is a city-bred, pampered young girl who lives life on her own terms, Saheb (Raja Goswami Om) is a well-read, upright yet grounded youth, who believes in simple living, with high ideals. But fate brings the two people together in wedlock.

Cast

Main cast
Aparajita Ghosh Das as Kojagori Mitra (Mallick) aka Phuljhuri - Main Lead and Titular Protagonist, Saheb's wife.
Raja Gowsami Om as Shouronil Mitra aka Saheb - Main Lead and Protagonist, Phuljhuri's husband.

Recurring cast
Ashok Bhattacharya as Amiyo Bhushan Chowdhury - Phuljhuri's (adoptive) grandfather.
Sudeshna Roy as Khona - Phuljhuri's aunt
Soma Banerjee as Noori - Phuljhuri's biological mother.
Sandip Dey as Phuljhuri's biological father.
Santu Mukherjee as Haradhan Mitra - Saheb's grandfather.
Anusuya Majumdar as Rashmoni Mitra aka Ginni Maa - Saheb's grandmother.
Goutam De as Saheb's granduncle 
Tanuka Chatterjee as Saheb's grandaunt  
Diganta Bagchi as Saheb's father
Manjushree Ganguly as Saheb's mother
Anushree Das as Saheb's eldest aunt
Anindya Chakraborti as Saheb's second elder paternal uncle
Rajashree Bhowmik as Saheb's second eldest aunt
Suman Banerjee as Saheb's eldest brother.
Samata Das as Saheb's eldest sister-in-law.
Manoj Ojha as Saheb's second eldest brother.
Sahana Sen as Saheb's second eldest sister-in-law.
Sourav Chatterjee as Ganesh Mitra - Saheb's third (elder) brother.
Saurav Das as Kartick Mitra - Saheb's fourth (elder) brother.
Debjani Chakraborty as Saheb's fourth (elder) sister-in-law.
Debolina Mukherjee as Saheb's fifth and last (elder) sister-in-law. 
Bulbuli Panja as Saheb's elder sister, Iqbal's wife.
Dhrubajyoti Sarkar as Iqbal - Saheb's brother-in-law.
Priya Paul as Diya- Saheb's protege turned lover, Amiyo Bhushan's actual granddaughter.

Special appearances
Soumitra Chatterjee in the episode Kobi Pronam
Haimanti Sukla in the episode Kobi Pronam.

Reception
The serial is being ranked as one of the most watched television serial from the day it has premiered on television. It now fetches a trp of 8.0. The serial received 4 awards at the Tele Samman Awards (2014).

See also
 Ei Chheleta Bhelbheleta
 Aparajita Ghosh Das
 Magic Moments Motion Pictures

References

External links

2013 Indian television series debuts
Bengali-language television programming in India
Zee Bangla original programming